Rob Auton is an English stand-up comedian, writer, actor, poet and podcaster.

He is best known for his series of shows title after and focusing on a specific subject, performed at the Edinburgh Festival Fringe each year since 2012.

Career 
Rob Auton started performing live in 2008, before having his first hour-long show, The Yellow Show, at the Edinburgh Festival Fringe in 2012, as well as touring it around the UK in 2013. The show was later made into a short film as part of Channel 4's Random Acts series.

Since then, he has performed a new show each year as part of the Edinburgh Festival Fringe, with each one being entirely centred around a very specific subject, from which the show's title is taken.

He is also a poet and illustrator, with his work having been published in a series of books by Burning Eye Books.

He is a member of Bang Said The Gun, a stand-up poetry collective founded by Dan Cockrill and Martin Galton, who perform regularly in London and have featured poets such as Roger McGough, Andrew Motion and John Hegley.

In 2013, Auton won the 'Dave Funniest Joke of the Edinburgh Fringe' award for "I heard a rumour that Cadbury is bringing out an oriental chocolate bar. Could be a Chinese Wispa."

As part of the 2014 Glastonbury Festival, Auton was given the position of poet-in-residence.

Auton has performed stand-up on shows including The Russell Howard Hour and Stand Up Central, and made his acting debut in 2018 as part of the long-running TV series Cold Feet.

In 2019, following the Edinburgh Festival Fringe, Auton performed The Time Show at the Melbourne International Comedy Festival, as well as touring it throughout the UK.

In 2020, Auton started a podcast titled The Rob Auton Daily Podcast, with a new episode posted every day during the year. It subsequently won the award for The Best Daily Podcast at the 2020 British Podcast Awards.

Selected work

Stand-up shows

Books

Acting

References

External links 
 Official website

Living people
Year of birth missing (living people)
21st-century English comedians
21st-century English male actors
English podcasters
21st-century English poets
Male actors from York